Geoff Hall may refer to:

 Geoff Hall (cricketer) (1941–2009), English cricketer
 Geoff Hall (politician) (born 1948), American teacher and politician in the Massachusetts House of Representatives 
 Geoff Hall (physicist), British particle physicist

See also
Jeff Hall (disambiguation)